William Thomson was a Scotland international rugby union player.

Rugby Union career

Amateur career

He also played for West of Scotland FC.

Provincial career

He was capped for Glasgow District in 1898.

International career

References

1876 births
1939 deaths
Scottish rugby union players
Scotland international rugby union players
West of Scotland FC players
Glasgow District (rugby union) players
Rugby union players from Glasgow
Rugby union forwards